Pasquale Giannotti (born 5 June 1999) is an Italian football player. He plays for  club Monopoli on loan from Crotone.

Club career

Crotone
He is the product of Crotone youth teams and played for their Under-19 squad beginning in the 2014–15 season. He made a handful of bench appearances for Crotone's senior squad in the 2017–18 Serie A season, but did not see any playing time.

Loan to Rende
On 17 August 2018, he joined Serie C club Rende on a season-long loan. He made his Serie C debut for Rende in their season opener on 16 September 2018 against Paganese, as a starter.

Loan to Virtus Francavilla
On 20 August 2020 he moved on loan to Virtus Francavilla.

Return from loans
Upon his return from loan, he started appearing for Crotone in the 2021–22 Serie B season.

Loan to Mopoli
On 3 January 2023, Giannotti was loaned to Monopoli.

References

External links
 

1999 births
Sportspeople from the Province of Crotone
Footballers from Calabria
Living people
Italian footballers
Association football midfielders
F.C. Crotone players
Virtus Francavilla Calcio players
S.S. Monopoli 1966 players
Serie B players
Serie C players